Kahel may refer to:
 Kahel-e Olya
 Kahel-e Sofla
 Kahel Qeshlaq